Elymnias patna, the blue-striped palmfly, is a butterfly in the family Nymphalidae. It was described by John Obadiah Westwood in 1851. It is found in the Indomalayan realm.

Subspecies
Elymnias patna patna (north-western India to Assam, Burma, possibly Thailand)
Elymnias patna patnoides (Moore, 1893) (Burma)
Elymnias patna stictica Fruhstorfer, 1902 (northern Indochina)
Elymnias patna hanitchi Martin, 1909 (Peninsular Malaysia)
Elymnias patna dohrni de Nicéville, 1895 (northern Sumatra)

References

External links
"Elymnias Hübner, 1818" at Markku Savela's Lepidoptera and Some Other Life Forms

Elymnias
Butterflies described in 1851